Clifton Charleswell (born May 26, 1961) is a former boxer who represented the United States Virgin Islands. He competed in the men's light welterweight event at the 1984 Summer Olympics. At the 1984 Summer Olympics, he lost to David Griffiths of Great Britain.

Charleswell also represented the United States Virgin Islands at the 1979 and 1983 Pan American Games.

References

1961 births
Living people
Light-welterweight boxers
United States Virgin Islands male boxers
Olympic boxers of the United States Virgin Islands
Boxers at the 1984 Summer Olympics
Pan American Games competitors for the United States Virgin Islands
Boxers at the 1979 Pan American Games
Boxers at the 1983 Pan American Games
Place of birth missing (living people)